The Rallye International de Madagascar is an international rally racing event organised by the Federation du Sport Auto-Moto de Madagascar. The rally, Madagascar's biggest annual motorsport event is based in the Madagascan capital of Antananarivo. The event is a round of the African Rally Championship and the Madagascan National Rally Championship.

The rally, the oldest event still running in African, began in 1951 as the Rally du Sud. It was renamed the Rallye Shell de Madagascar in 1953, then the Grand rallye International de Madagascar in 1970. Political instability which in turn led to the collapse of the Madagascan economy saw the rally suspended after the 1972 event. The Grand Rallye de Madagascar returned briefly from 1986 to 1990 before the collapse of the military government saw another period of suspension.

1997 saw the Rallye International de Madagascar return again only briefly until 2001. Another rally was held in 2003 before it returned in 2010 as a candidate rally for the African Rally Championship. Its success saw the event graduate to ARC status for 2010.

The French influence over the event is strong. French colonial rule of Madagascar ended in 1960 but the first local driver to win the event was not until 1966. French cars likewise have dominated the event with Citroën, Peugeots and Renaults dominating the results, still providing winning cars right up until 1999 despite the influence of the Japanese manufacturers on the sport globally. One of the odd traditions of Madagascar rallying is competitors are commonly referred to by nicknames and pseudonyms rather than their actual names. "Joda", otherwise known as Jean-Yves Ranarivelo is the most successful driver in the rallies history with five victories spread between 1990 and the first African championship event in 2011.

List of winners
Sourced in part from:

References

External links
Official website
Federation du Sport Auto-Moto de Madagascar
African Rally Championship

Motorsport in Africa
Recurring sporting events established in 1951
1951 establishments in Madagascar
African Rally Championship
Rally competitions in Madagascar